The John, the Lord Chamberlain series is a series of historical mystery novels by Mary Reed and Eric Mayer. Also known as the "John the Eunuch" mysteries, the novels feature John, Emperor Justinian's Lord Chamberlain, a eunuch who solves mysteries in 6th-century Constantinople. Publishers Weekly praises the series' "Subtle, well-drawn characters, from the ascetic John to the capricious and enigmatic Justinian; deft descriptive detail revealing life in the late Roman Empire; and sharp dialogue make this another winner in this outstanding historical series."

Novels
One for Sorrow (1999)  (Poisoned Pen Press)
Two for Joy (2000)  (Poisoned Pen Press)
Three for a Letter (2001)  (Poisoned Pen Press)
Four for a Boy (2003)  (Poisoned Pen Press)
Five for Silver (2004)  (Poisoned Pen Press)
Six for Gold (2005)  (Poisoned Pen Press)
Seven for a Secret (2008)  (Poisoned Pen Press)
Eight for Eternity (2010)  (Poisoned Pen Press)
Nine for the Devil (2012)  (Poisoned Pen Press)
Ten for Dying (2014)  (Poisoned Pen Press)
Murder in Megara (2015)  (Poisoned Pen Press)
An Empire for Ravens (2018)  (Poisoned Pen Press)

Fictional character biography
The life story of John the Lord Chamberlain (sometimes also known as John the Eununch) is told in disconnected episodes throughout all the books, but the series begins with John being a freed ex-slave who now serves the emperor Justinian as the Imperial Chamberlain.

John was born somewhere in Greece to a rich family and was sent to the Academy at Athens to learn under the scholar Philo (Bk 2) but grew impatient and left the academy to serve as a mercenary overseas, going as far as Britain (Bk 1). It's revealed that because one of his comrades drowned in a river, John is hydrophobic and is afraid of swimming.

Afterwards, John left and became a travelling performer with a theatrical group. On Crete, he falls in love with Cornelia, a gymnast (Bk 3). Both John and Cornelia consummate their relationship, but near the border with the Sassanian empire, John is abducted, castrated, and then sold off to the Imperial government as a eunuch. He first works under the Master of the Plate, Leukos (who is murdered by a corrupt innkeeper in Bk 1), but wins his freedom and eventually rises to the rank of Imperial Chamberlain after investigation into the death of a Byzantine magnate named Hypatius (Bk 4).

Although John enjoys the confidence of the emperor, his escapades and investigations makes him many enemies, from the page boy Hektor all the way to the empress Theodora (whose murder of a young Gothic prince has to be covered up by John in Bk 2). John however is not without allies, ranging from his colleagues Felix and Anatolius, all the way to his servants Hypatia and Peter, and much later his daughter by Cornelia, named Europa.

References

External links

Historical novels by series
Mystery novels by series
Fictional historical detectives
Novels set in the Byzantine Empire
Novels set in the 6th century
Cultural depictions of Justinian I
Cultural depictions of Theodora I
Works based on nursery rhymes